Alejandra Ghersi Rodríguez (born 14 October 1989), known professionally as Arca, is a Venezuelan musician and record producer based in Barcelona, Spain. She initially began releasing music under the name of Nuuro. After attending the Clive Davis Institute of Recorded Music, Ghersi first released the EP Baron Libre (2012) under the name Arca and subsequently released the EPs Stretch 1 and Stretch 2; the latter experimented with hip hop and brought her attention from prominent music publications.

She released her first two albums, Xen and Mutant, in 2014 and 2015 respectively. Her eponymous third album, Arca (2017), became the first to prominently feature her vocals. From 2020-2021, Ghersi released the Kick quintet, starting with the album Kick I (2020) and ending with Kick IIIII (2021); these recordings drew from styles such as IDM, reggaeton, avant-pop, and techno. Ghersi has frequently incorporated themes related to gender identity, non-binary identification, and psychosexuality in her work, particularly after coming out in 2018.

Ghersi has also worked frequently with other artists as producer and collaborator. She received production credits on releases such as Kanye West's Yeezus (2013), FKA Twigs' EP2 (2013), LP1 (2014), and  Björk's Vulnicura (2015), Utopia (2017). She has additionally contributed to music by artists such as Kelela, The Weeknd, Frank Ocean, Planningtorock, Rosalía and Sia.

Early life
Arca was born in Caracas as Alejandro Ghersi. Her father, Henrique Ghersi Rossón, is an investment banker and founder of VIP Capital (Venezuelan Investment Partners), an investment banking firm in Venezuela. Additionally, she has an older brother whose music collection she would frequently listen to during her childhood.

The Ghersi family relocated to Darien, Connecticut when Ghersi was three years old, before returning to Caracas when she was nine years old. Ghersi described Darien as a "'white picket fences'" town with "'deer and tick'". After returning to Caracas, Ghersi eventually began playing the friction drum and started producing electronic music on FL Studio. She released music in her adolescence by the name of Nuuro, and received moderate popularity in her home country, with praise from big national artists such as Los Amigos Invisibles. She also did collaborations with fellow Venezuelan artists during this period, such as programming the synthesizers in La Vida Bohème's Grammy nominated album Nuestra. She later attended the Clive Davis Institute of Recorded Music at NYU.

Career

2012–2016: Production work, Stretch EPs, &&&&&, Xen, and Mutant
On 1 February 2012, Ghersi released Arca's debut extended play (EP), Baron Libre, through UNO NYC. Later that year, she released the Stretch 1 and Stretch 2 EPs on 19 April and 6 August respectively.

In 2013, she was credited for additional production, programming and songwriting for five of the songs on Kanye West's Yeezus, which was released on 18 June. Ghersi also served as one of the three production consultants. That same year on 23 July, she released her debut mixtape, &&&&& through SoundCloud and Hippos in Tanks. The project included an audio-visual performance alongside Jesse Kanda, who contributed the visuals, at MoMA PS1 in October 2013. On 17 September, FKA Twigs' EP2 was released, on which Arca produced and co-wrote every song.

On 11 September 2014, it was announced that Arca signed with British label Mute Records and released the lead single, "Thievery", from her then upcoming debut studio album, Xen. One more single was released prior to the album's release, "Now You Know" on 31 October 2014 alongside a music video.Xen was released on 4 November 2014 via Mute Records. Arca made significant contributions to Björk's eighth studio album Vulnicura which was released on 20 January 2015. She was credited as the co-producer of seven of the tracks, and the co-writer of two. According to Ghersi, the two began collaborating after her manager sent &&&&& to Björk's team and the musician contacted her through email.

Ghersi collaborated with American singer Kelela on her Hallucinogen EP, which was released in October 2015. She was credited for producing, recording, mixing and co-writing two of the tracks, including the title track, which is an instrumental from &&&&& with Kelela adding improvised vocals. The following month, Arca's second studio album, Mutant, was released on 20 November 2015. She released the Entrañas mixtape on 4 July 2016, following the single "Sin Rumbo".

2017–2022: Arca and Kick series
On 22 February 2017, Arca signed with XL Recordings and released "Piel", the lead single from the eponymous third studio album, Arca. The track was noted for featuring Ghersi singing which many reviewers considered a contrast from her older works. The release of Arca was preceded by three more singles: "Anoche", "Reverie" and "Saunter". Arca was released on 7 April 2017 via XL Recordings to widespread acclaim from music critics and was featured on numerous year-end lists. To promote the album, a music video for "Desafío" was released while "Saunter" and "Reverie" were released as twelve-inch singles.

Later in 2017, Arca collaborated with Björk again on her ninth studio album Utopia, producing the vast majority of the record. Björk explained that the album explored "the Arca-Björk overlap". A music video featuring Arca for "Arisen My Senses" was released on 18 December 2017. Arca also collaborated with Kelela on her debut studio album, Take Me Apart, released in October 2017. Kelela said she "anchored" the album and produced a bulk of it. She is credited for producing on four tracks, and co-writing two.

In September 2019, Arca held a series of performances at New York City cultural venue The Shed during a live shoot for a "yet-to-be released project". The series, titled "Mutant;Faith" was held from 25 September - 28 September and consisted of four acts. It was noted by fashion magazines Vogues Rachel Hahn and Papers Matt Moen for its improvised nature while the latter also noticed the interactive element of the performances. The performances featured guest appearances from Björk and American actor Oscar Isaac.

On 19 February 2020, Arca released a 62-minute single named "@@@@@" along with an audiovisual directed by Frederik Heyman. The track was released on XL Recordings on 21 February. Along with the single, 13 international tour dates were announced for Spring 2020. Her fourth album Kick I, featuring Björk, Rosalía, Shygirl and Sophie, was announced on 8 March 2020 as part of an anthology and released on 26 June 2020; for this album Arca was nominated to the Grammys 2021. in July 2020, it was announced that a reissue of &&&&& would be released and the track "Knot" was released as the lead single. The mixtape was reissued to celebrate the anniversary of Berlin based experimental label PAN. In September 2021, Arca's remix of "Rain on Me" by Lady Gaga and Ariana Grande, which samples the songs "Time" and "Mequetrefe" from Kick I, was released as part of Gaga's remix album Dawn of Chromatica.

The follow-up albums to Kick I, titled Kick II, Kick III and Kick IIII, were originally scheduled to be released on December 3, 2021. However, starting with Kick II on November 30, albums were released in sequence within that week. A fifth installment, Kick IIIII, was released "as a surprise" on December 3. Arca co-produced the track "Tears in the Club" by FKA Twigs featuring Canadian singer the Weeknd, which was released later that month as the lead single for FKA Twigs' mixtape Caprisongs. Arca also produced the track "Thank You Song" by FKA Twigs, the closing track from the same mixtape.

Artistry

Musical style and lyrical themes 
Ghersi's work published under the Arca name has been labelled as experimental music, hip hop music and IDM, while her music released under Nuuro has been described as "electronic indie pop" and "dreamy synth-pop". She frequently incorporates themes of psychosexuality, science fiction and gender identity into her music.

Ghersi's music as Arca has been compared to the music of British electronic producer Aphex Twin while the eponymous album Arca (2017) was compared to compositions by German composers Robert Schumann and Felix Mendelssohn. The latter is known for being her first album as Arca to prominently incorporate lyricism. Stretch 1 and Stretch 2 which were released in 2012, have been compared to hip hop and club music. Reviewing Mutant (2015), Mark Richardson retrospectively compared Xen (2014) to classical music while the former leaned "toward soundscape". Xen was noted by The Quietus Gary Suarez to contain themes of gender and sexuality which were opined to be mainly implicit through the album's music videos. Kick I (2020) has been considered avant-pop while reggaeton was a prominent genre featured, on Kick II (2021). Kick III (2021) has been noted of its influences of IDM while Kick IIIII (2021) has been dubbed ambient techno music. Kick IIIII (2021) has been dubbed "dark electronica" music by Joe Goggins of DIY.

Influences 
During her childhood, Ghersi cites her brother's music, which included Aphex Twin, British musician Squarepusher and Björk as heavily influencing her. The American composer and electronic musician Wendy Carlos has also been a major influence.

According to Ghersi, the latter inspired her to use her voice prominently on her eponymous third studio album, Arca and also helped her "find" her voice, following the development of a creative partnership between the pair. She has also cited her love for pop music which influenced the making of Kick I. Arca also cites Madonna as an influence, saying:  "I don't know if I can overstate how major Madonna's music and persona were in my household".

She cited German composer Richard Wagner's Der Ring des Nibelungen as a primary inspiration for the Kick series and called nightclubs the place she found a "home". Remezcla's Alberto De La Roza noted the influence of reggaeton on Ghersi's work.

Visuals 
From 2012 to 2018, Ghersi often collaborated with Jesse Kanda on the visual aspect of her albums. He created the album artwork for her albums Xen (2014), Mutant (2015) and Arca (2017). She also collaborated with German photographer and director Daniel Sannwald to create her music videos.

For the Kick series, Frederik Heyman created the album artwork for all of the albums except for Kick I, which was created by her, Catalan artist Carlota Guerrero and Spanish multimedia artist Carlos Sáez.

Ghersi's visuals for covers, music videos and packaging are, at times, sexually explicit or intentionally unsettling. In particular, the imagery featured in the artwork for Ghersi's single "Vanity" and the music video for her single "Thievery" were marked as NSFW, the former of which, resulted in a temporary ban on her Instagram account. Arca's music video for "Reverie" (directed by Jesse Kanda) is age-restricted on YouTube for its graphic, violent imagery and sexual content.

Personal life
Arca came out as non-binary in 2018, later adding that she identifies as a trans woman, and goes by she/her and it/its pronouns. As of 2022 Arca has stated on her Instagram bio that she also uses they/them pronouns. In 2020 she stated in an interview for Vice: "I see my gender identity as non-binary, and I identify as a trans Latina woman, and yet, I don't want to encourage anyone to think that my gayness has been banished. And when I talk about gayness, it's funny because I'm not thinking about who I'm attracted to. It's a form of cultural production that is individual and collective, which I don't ever want to renounce".

Arca lived in London and resides in Barcelona as of 2018. She dated Daniel Sannwald, and later the Spanish multimedia artist Carlos Sáez, who has often collaborated in the realization of her projects. The song "Failed" is written about her relationship with the former while the song "Calor" chronicles her relationship with the latter.

Discography

 Xen (2014)
 Mutant (2015)
 Arca (2017)
 Kick I (2020)
 Kick II (2021)
 Kick III (2021)
 Kick IIII (2021)
 Kick IIIII (2021)

Awards and nominations

Notes

References

External links

 
 

1989 births
Living people
20th-century Venezuelan LGBT people
21st-century Venezuelan LGBT people
Venezuelan transgender people
Venezuelan non-binary people
Audio engineers
Electronic dance music DJs
Experimental musicians
Hip hop record producers
Industrial musicians
LGBT DJs
LGBT people in Latin music
Venezuelan LGBT songwriters
Venezuelan LGBT singers
Transgender songwriters
Musicians from Caracas
Mute Records artists
Non-binary singers
Non-binary songwriters
Tisch School of the Arts alumni
Transgender singers
Transgender women musicians
Transgender non-binary people
Venezuelan DJs
Venezuelan electronic musicians
Venezuelan expatriates in England
Venezuelan expatriates in Spain
Venezuelan expatriates in the United States
Venezuelan performance artists
Venezuelan record producers
Women in electronic music
Women in Latin music
LGBT record producers